Alexander Vasilyevich Druzhinin, (October 20, 1824 – January 31, 1864), was a Russian writer, translator, and magazine editor.

Biography
Druzhinin was born into a wealthy family in the district of Golov, part of Saint Petersburg Governorate. He was educated at home until the age of sixteen, and then sent to military school. Upon graduation in 1843, he joined the Life-Guards Finland Regiment of the Russian Imperial Guard, where he was chosen as regimental librarian. In 1846 he retired from the military and took up a civil service post. He left the civil service after five years in order to devote himself entirely to literary pursuits.

From 1848 to 1855 he was the literary editor of the important journal Sovremennik (The Contemporary). During this time he published a large number of short novels, stories, and feuilletons, translated various works of English literature into Russian and wrote a biography of the painter Pavel Fedotov.

In 1847 he published his most popular work, the epistolary novella Polinka Saks. He followed this up with The Story of Aleksei Dmitrich in 1848. Both were published in Sovremennik, and received praise from the prominent critic Vissarion Belinsky. After the death of Belinsky in 1848, Druzhinin and Pavel Annenkov became Russia's most prominent critics.

After he left Sovremennik, he edited the journal The Library for Reading, where he espoused a conservative view of literature, denying that it should be subordinated to social and political aims, which was the approach advocated by Chernyshevsky and Dobrolyubov, the ideological voices of Sovremennik. Druzhinin became one of the chief proponents of the aesthetic movement in Russian literature, along with Pavel Annenkov and Vasily Botkin.

Druzhinin was also the major initiator of the Literary Fund, an organization whose purpose was to give financial assistance to needy writers. Fyodor Dostoyevsky served as secretary to the fund between 1863 and 1865. Dostoyevsky also participated with Druzhinin in fundraising for the organization.

Druzhinin was on friendly terms with many of his more famous contemporaries, including Leo Tolstoy, Alexander Ostrovsky, and Ivan Turgenev, whom he exchanged letters with. He died of tuberculosis in 1864, and was buried in Volkovo Cemetery in Saint Petersburg.

English literature
Druzhinin worked hard to acquaint Russian readers with English literature. He translated three of Shakespeare's plays: King Lear, Coriolanus and Richard III. He published a series of essays entitled Boswell and Johnson, about English life in the eighteenth century, and he wrote a life of George Crabbe which included numerous extracts from his poetry.

Works
Polinka Saks, and The Story of Aleksei Dmitrich, Translated by Michael R. Katz, Northwestern University Press, 1992.

References

1824 births
1864 deaths
Writers from Saint Petersburg
People from Sankt-Peterburgsky Uyezd
Russian nobility
Novelists from the Russian Empire
Military personnel of the Russian Empire
Short story writers from the Russian Empire
Journalists from the Russian Empire
Male writers from the Russian Empire
Translators from the Russian Empire
Russian biographers
Male biographers
Russian magazine editors
19th-century journalists
Russian male journalists
19th-century translators from the Russian Empire
20th-century biographers
19th-century novelists from the Russian Empire
Male novelists
19th-century short story writers from the Russian Empire
19th-century male writers from the Russian Empire
20th-century Russian short story writers
20th-century Russian male writers